Diana Tishchenko (born  1990) is a German classical violinist of Ukrainian descent and the winner of the International Long Thibaud Crespin Competition in Paris 2018. Named “Rising Star” by the European Concert Hall Organisation (ECHO) in 2020, she has performed at the leading concert halls of Europe.

Career 
Born in Simferopol, on the Crimean Peninsula Tishchenko started playing the violin with her aunt at the age of 6, making her debut performance with the Crimean Philharmonic Orchestra conducted by Alexey Gulianitzky at the age of 8, playing a violin concerto by Charles Beriot. She studied further at the Lysenko Specialized Music School in Kyiv with Tamara Mukhina. She played in the Gustav Mahler Youth Orchestra from age 18, later serving as the orchestra's youngest concertmaster, until 2013, collaborating with conductors such as Colin Davis, Franz Welser-Möst, Herbert Blomstedt, Antonio Pappano and Daniele Gatti. She achieved her MA and concert diploma from the Hochschule für Musik Hanns Eisler Berlin, where she studied with Ulf Wallin. She studied also with Boris Kuschnir at the University of Music and Performing Arts Graz.

Tishchenko was a laureate at the ARD International Music Competition in Munich in 2013. She won the Lyon International Chamber Music Competition in the violin and piano duo category in 2014, and the Felix Mendelssohn-Bartholdy Music Academy Berlin Competition in 2017. She was awarded the Grand Prix Jacques Thibaud at the Long Thibaud Crespin Competition in Paris.

In 2018, she participated in the festival of the Kronberg Academy, playing chamber music with Gidon Kremer, Steven Isserlis and Christian Tetzlaff, among others. She released her first solo album in 2019, Strangers in PARadISe.

Tishchenko was a Rising Star of the European Concert Hall Organisation (ECHO) in 2020/21. She was soloist in a series of concerts given by the Kyiv Symphony Orchestra touring Germany in April and May 2022, conducted by Luigi Gaggero. She played Chausson's Poème and Skoryk's Melody in A minor (1982) at the Berliner Philharmonie, the Gewandhaus in Leipzig and the Kulturpalast in Dresden.

The active residence of Diana Tishchenko today is located in Berlin.

References

External links 
 
 

1990 births
Date of birth missing (living people)
Living people
Musicians from Simferopol
Ukrainian classical violinists
Hochschule für Musik Hanns Eisler Berlin alumni
University of Music and Performing Arts Graz alumni
Long-Thibaud-Crespin Competition prize-winners